The Cutty Sark Tournament was a golf tournament that was played from 1964 to 1972. It was a 72-hole stroke-play event, played in Scotland. John Panton won the event three times in the first four years. The event was sponsored by the owners of Cutty Sark whisky.

Winners

References

Golf tournaments in Scotland
Recurring sporting events established in 1964
Recurring sporting events disestablished in 1972
1964 establishments in Scotland
1972 disestablishments in Scotland